Arif Karaoğlan (born 21 January 1986) is a Turkish former professional footballer who played as a striker. He spent a few years in the youth setup at Nottingham Forest, before returning to Germany in 2005.

References

External links
 
 

1986 births
Living people
Sportspeople from Gaziantep
Turkish footballers
Association football forwards
Turkey youth international footballers
Nottingham Forest F.C. players
1. FC Saarbrücken players
2. Bundesliga players
SVN Zweibrücken players
Borussia Neunkirchen players
SV Röchling Völklingen players
21st-century Turkish people